Kirill Sergeyevich Rodionov (born 22 April 1996) is a Russian football player who plays for FC Rotor Volgograd.

Club career
He made his professional debut in the Russian Professional Football League for FC Khimki on 16 August 2014 in a game against FC Pskov-747.

He made his Russian Football National League debut for FC Baltika Kaliningrad on 11 July 2016 in a game against FC Shinnik Yaroslavl.

References

External links
 
 

1996 births
People from Krasnogorsky District, Moscow Oblast
Sportspeople from Moscow Oblast
Living people
Russian footballers
Association football midfielders
FC Khimki players
FC Baltika Kaliningrad players
FC Veles Moscow players
FC Neftekhimik Nizhnekamsk players
FC Rotor Volgograd players
Russian First League players
Russian Second League players